Kathleen Lynch is an American dancer and performance artist, best known as American punk band Butthole Surfers' "naked dancer" from 1986 to 1989; however, she was never officially part of the band.

In 1988, Lynch and the Butthole Surfers appeared in Bar-B-Que Movie, a short Super 8 movie directed by actor/filmmaker Alex Winter. A spoof of 1974's The Texas Chain Saw Massacre, the film ends with a music video-style performance of the song "Fast" (a.k.a. "Fart Song"), featuring Gibby Haynes, Paul Leary, King Coffey, Teresa Nervosa, and Jeff Pinkus, as well as Lynch. It also displayed many of the band's stage gimmicks, such as the burning cymbal, strobe lights, films, and smoke.

After her stint with the Butthole Surfers, Lynch went on to front the New York-based psychedelic rock band Beme Seed.  Beme Seed gained underground popularity in the West Philadelphia music scene from several performances at the Pi Lambda Phi fraternity at the University of Pennsylvania.

Notes

American female dancers
American dancers
Butthole Surfers members
Living people
Year of birth missing (living people)